Polygonus savigny, or Manuel's skipper, is a species of dicot skipper in the butterfly family Hesperiidae. It is found in North America.

Subspecies
These two subspecies belong to the species Polygonus savigny:
 Polygonus savigny punctus Bell & Comstock, 1852
 Polygonus savigny savigny (Latreille, 1824)

References

Further reading

 

Eudaminae
Articles created by Qbugbot